Ariane's Thread is a 2014 French comedy-drama film directed by Robert Guédiguian and written by Guédiguian and Serge Valletti.

Cast 
 Ariane Ascaride as Ariane 
 Jacques Boudet as Jack
 Jean-Pierre Darroussin as Taxi Driver / Stage Director 
 Anaïs Demoustier as Martine / Actress 
 Youssouf Djaoro as Night Watchman 
 Adrien Jolivet as Raphaël
 Gérard Meylan as Denis 
 Lola Naymark as Lola 
 Judith Magre as The Turtle (voice)

Reception 
Ronnie Scheib of Variety had this to say: "While 'Ariane’s Thread' evokes the poetic realism of the 1930s French populist cinema of Feydeau, Prevert, Vigo and early Renoir, it does so less in terms of an organic visual style and more in terms of its expression of a shared ethos." Jerome Cabanel, writing for The Hollywood Reporter, considered "Yet while there aren’t too many rewards offered at the end of the maze [], there’s something pleasurable in soaking in the warm atmosphere and touching characters, with the director’s trusty cast indulging in a series of easygoing conversations and playful bickering []."

References

External links 
 

2014 films
2010s French-language films
French fantasy comedy-drama films
2010s fantasy comedy-drama films
Films directed by Robert Guédiguian
Films set in Marseille
2010s French films